Sing, Unburied, Sing is the third novel by the American author Jesmyn Ward and published by Scribner in 2017. It focuses on a family in the fictional town of Bois Sauvage, Mississippi. The novel received overwhelmingly positive reviews, and was named by The New York Times as one of the 10 Best Books of 2017.

Characters 
Joseph (Jojo) is a main character and one of three narrators. He is the child of Michael, who is white, and Leonie, who is Black. The story starts on his thirteenth birthday at his maternal grandparents' house in the fictional town of Bois Sauvage, Mississippi. Throughout the book Jojo often acts as a parent to his younger sister Kayla because his mother, Leonie, is not always present. Because of his strained relationship with his mother, Jojo looks up to his grandfather, who has been more of a paternal figure while Jojo's father was in prison, and wishes to be like him. Throughout the book, Jojo has many conversations with spirits while helping them move on to the afterlife.

Leonie is the daughter of River and Philomene, and mother to Jojo and Kayla. She is the second of three narrators of the story. Leonie became pregnant at a young age, not certain she wanted to be a mother. The trauma of her younger life leads Leonie to cope by turning to drugs. The high from the drugs give her the ability to see her deceased brother, Given. Leonie is consumed by her love for Michael and is inattentive to the needs of her children. She is also jealous of her children's relationship because it reminds her of the brother she lost too early in life and her failures as a mother, since Jojo takes on more of her parental role.

River (Pop) is Jojo's and Kayla's maternal grandfather. He is the father of Leonie and Given. He is the main parental figure in Jojo's life, which makes him the role model Jojo looks up to. He is quietly dignified and capable. Pop spent some time in Parchman prison when he was young and developed a "care giver" relationship with another inmate, Richie. Pop shares pieces of his stories with Jojo about Richie and Parchman throughout the book.

Philomene (Mam) is Jojo and Kayla's maternal grandmother. She is the mother of Leonie and Given. She comes from a long line of women who can heal and communicate with dead people. This gift was not passed on to her daughter, Leonie, but instead to her grandchildren. Mam steps up to look after Jojo and Kayla when she realizes Leonie does not care enough for her children. Mam is sick with cancer when the novel begins and becomes bedridden from chemotherapy treatments, which ultimately forces Leonie to step up as a motherly figure. 

Misty is Leonie's white friend from work. Misty and Leonie are bound to each other by their drug addiction and their bond over both being in interracial relationships. Misty joins Leonie on a road trip to Parchman prison to pick up Michael after his release.

Michael is Leonie's boyfriend and the father of Jojo and Kayla. He is white and comes from a racist family that doesn’t accept his relationship with Leonie or their kids. Michael, however, is not racist. At the beginning of the novel, he is incarcerated in the Mississippi State Penitentiary, also known as Parchman Farm, for drug trafficking. He then joins his family after Leonie and their children pick him up. Like Leonie, Michael is an absent parent who also has a drug addiction issue. 

Michaela (Kayla) is Jojo's three-year-old little sister. She interacts with Jojo as a parental figure and prefers him to her mother, Leonie. Kayla, like Jojo, is able to see ghosts. Kayla is given the final word of "shh" to her brother. Kayla is emblematic of the future. Through Kayla's voice in the final scene, Ward ends this novel on an optimistic note.

Given is Leonie's older brother who was shot on a hunting trip by Michael's cousin when he was a senior in high school. Leonie sees Given's ghost throughout the novel, especially when she uses drugs. It is not until the penultimate chapter when Given's ghost is freed, and Leonie does not see him anymore.

Richie knows River from their time spent together in Parchman. He was imprisoned in Parchman at twelve years old for stealing food to feed his nine siblings. Richie tried to escape later with an inmate named Blue, who was skinned and killed during their failed attempt. River killed Richie to spare him from any further pain he would face in prison. Richie's ghost follows Jojo back to Pop after Jojo arrives to pick up his father from Parchman. Richie is the third narrator of the story and he struggles to understand and accept his death. 

Big Joseph is Michael's father. He does not have a good relationship with his son and the rest of the family because Michael is in a relationship with Leonie, a Black woman. Big Joseph was present at the trial for his nephew after shooting Leonie’s brother prior to her and Michael’s relationship which adds to Leonie’s discomfort with Big Joseph. When Michael, Leonie, Jojo, and Kayla visit him, it results in Big Joseph and Michael physically fighting.

Maggie is Michael's mother. She, also, does not have a healthy relationship with her son, but unlike her husband, she tries to make an effort. She inhospitably welcomes Michael, Leonie, Jojo, and Kayla into her home in an effort to salvage her relationship with her son, but will not stand up to her husband.

Plot 

The novel begins on Jojo's thirteenth birthday. To step into his new role as a man, Jojo tries to help his grandfather, Pop, kill a goat. He is sickened by the slaughter, but Pop is not disappointed in him, as he had feared. Pop uses the goat to make stew and while the food is cooking, he tells Jojo about his family. Pop tells Jojo about how he was sent to Parchman prison when he was 15. Pop's older brother, Stag, got into a bar fight with some white Navy officers. The officers came after Stag and also took Pop, who was home at that time. Both boys were then sent to Parchman prison. It was there that Pop met Richie, a 12-year-old inmate. Leonie receives a call during the birthday celebration, and it is Michael, Jojo and Kayla's father, informing Leonie that he is coming home from prison where he has been for three years. 

The next day, Leonie argues with Pop about whether she should take Jojo and Kayla with her on the trip. At Mam's suggestion, she invites her coworker Misty, whose boyfriend is also incarcerated in Parchman. While she talks to her mom, Leonie realizes that Mam's cancer is getting worse.

During the car ride, Jojo finds a gris-gris bag from Pop with instructions to keep it close. He also recalls Pop telling him about Kinnie Wagner, a white inmate who looked after the dogs at Parchman (based on the real-life Kenny Wagner). Because of Pop's affinity with animals, Kinnie chose him to help look after the dogs. Leonie's party arrives at the house of a white woman, and Jojo walks around and finds a man cooking meth. Misty leaves the woman's house with a bag of meth which she tries to hide from Jojo and Kayla. Back in the car, Kayla begins to get sick. Leonie remembers Mam teaching her about plants that help with an upset stomach. Leonie needs wild strawberries but is only able to find wild blackberries.

Jojo holds Kayla and tries to comfort her by telling her stories. Eventually, they pull over to the house of Al, Michael's lawyer. Leonie cooks the blackberry leaves. Jojo doesn’t trust Leonie and doesn’t think the wild blackberries will help, but he is afraid Leonie will hit him if he says anything. After Leonie, Misty, and Al leave the room, Jojo forces Kayla to throw up Leonie's mixture. Instead of sleeping, Jojo recalls Pop telling him about when Richie got whipped for breaking his hoe and Kinnie escaped from Parchman. In the morning they drive to Parchman and check Michael out of prison. When Michael comes out, he embraces Leonie. He tries to hold Kayla but she doesn’t recognize him. Kayla throws up again. Jojo looks outside the car and sees the ghost of Richie.

The next chapter is narrated by Richie. He recognizes Jojo as Pop's child and recalls how Pop protected him while they were in Parchman. No one in the car except for Jojo and Kayla can see Richie.

On the drive back, the group is pulled over by a police officer. There is no time to hide the meth, so Leonie swallows it. Leonie, without thinking, tells the officer that they are coming back from Parchman. The officer handcuffs Leonie. He also handcuffs Michael. Jojo get out of the car with Kayla and the officer handcuffs him too. Jojo reaches into his pocket to grab the gris-gris bag Pop gave him and the officer pulls out his gun on him. Misty drops Kayla, who runs to Jojo and wraps herself around him. Kayla throws up on the officer and he lets them go.

When they arrive back at the house, they realize that Mam and Pop are not in the house. Michael wants to go to his parents' house, and Leonie doesn’t want to but she eventually gives in. When they arrive at Michael's parents' house, his mother is at first civil and urges Michael's dad, Big Joseph, to do the same. However, Big Joseph is unable to restrain himself and calls Leonie a slur. Michael head-butts Big Joseph and they start fighting. They drive back home where Pop and Mam have returned. Leonie goes to see Mam, who tells Leonie to gather necessary items to perform a ritual to summon Maman Brigitte, a death loa in voodoo. Richie sees Pop and tries to talk to him, but Pop is unable to see him.

Jojo asks Pop about what happened to Richie and Pop finally tells Jojo. A man named Blue raped one of the female inmates at Parchman. Richie caught Blue in the act and escaped Parchman with him. While they were running, Blue happened upon a white girl and ripped her dress. The girl then reported this incident, and the local white population decided to seek revenge through lynching Blue. Pop knew that the white men wouldn't make a distinction between Blue and Richie. When the white men caught up with Blue and Richie, they skinned Blue alive and cut off parts of his body. To protect Richie from the same fate, Pop stabbed him in the neck, killing him quickly. Pop has been haunted by this action ever since. After he tells Jojo the story, he breaks down in tears and Jojo consoles him. Richie's ghost screams and disappears.

Leonie enters Mam's room to find her in a terrible state. Her room smells like rot. Mam tells Leonie that it is too late. Mam sees Richie on the ceiling. He is vengeful. Richie shouts at Mam, urging her to come with him, but Given shouts at him that Mam is not his mother. Jojo and Pop run in and Leonie jumps into action and begins saying the litany to summon Maman Brigitte. Jojo tells Richie to leave because nobody owes him anything anymore. Richie leaves and Given takes Mam with him. Mam dies. Michael comes back and he and Leonie leave.

In the final chapter, Jojo explains that he sleeps in Leonie's bed now. Leonie and Michael only come back for two days out of every week, and then they leave again. Pop sleeps in Mam's room now and he talks to himself at night, searching for Mam. Although he hoped he would be able to, Jojo is not able to see Mam and Given, he only sees Richie. He also sees other ghosts who have all died through violent means. Kayla tells the ghosts to go home but they don’t listen to her. She begins to sing and they all smile with relief.

Themes

Sing, Unburied, Sing is the first of Ward's novels to introduce a supernatural element. A dead boy, Richie, is one of the narrators, and other ghosts are found throughout the novel as they tie the past to the present and future. Likewise, Mam and Pop project a belief in spirituality through gris-gris bags, which contain objects of nature that are assumed to administer power for humans. In the novel, the spiritual connection between nature and man is prevalent through their African-based traditions.

The novel demonstrates the afterlife of slavery in America. Songs and story-telling play a role in building resilience. Singing to the unresting spirits at the end of the story, Kayla represents hope for the future. This theme is also represented through the prison system in which many black people, especially black men, are imprisoned unethically and forced to do hard labor in the fields of Parchman which was once a plantation. Both Pop (River) and Richie's stories share the haunting reality of this unjust recreation of slavery within Southern America.

Another theme is family, for it offers differing insights into the roles of parenting. In the beginning we see that Jojo refers to his parents by first names, Leonie and Michael. Though they care for Jojo and Kayla, Leonie and Michael are absent mother and father figures. They tend to dissociate themselves from their responsibilities through drug usage. Thus, Jojo looks to his Pop and Mam as the family's caretakers. Jojo also takes on the task of being Kayla's guardian, protecting her in any way he can. This also shows distrust between members of the family. When Leonie gives Kayla the blackberry mixture, Jojo later forces her to throw it up. He does not trust Leonie to take care of Kayla, because he believes that is his role.

Racial relations are also discussed throughout the novel through the family's interracial dynamics. Though Michael appears to love Leonie despite their differing skin colors, his family sternly disapproves of the life he leads. Michael's father, Big Joseph, showcases the lingering tensions of white supremacy in the South. He protects Michael's cousin after killing Given, since the cousin was upholding Southern ideals of Black inferiority. In the same manner, Big Joseph rejects his own son, Michael, for defying this tradition with his bi-racial children. 

Life versus Death is a reoccurring theme throughout the story beginning with Jojo's story. He opens the story with the line, “I like to think I know what death is. I like to think it is something I could look at straight.”   This is followed by a scene where Jojo helps Pop slaughter a goat. This scene reminds us of Jojo's innocence as a child even though he has to act grown up in this world. This death scene immediately presents over the rest of the story, looms over the characters, reminding them of the constant presence of death in their lives and how it continues to affect them and eventually will take them from this world. The presence of the ghosts, Richie and Given, play with the theme of death in relation to the afterlife. Although both characters are actually dead, they continuously live through the other characters and through Pop's stories of Richie. Their interactions with each of the characters influence the character's thoughts and actions, especially Jojo's, as his life parallels with Richie's story. Mam's looming sickness and eventual passing also reveal the influence of death over each of her family's lives as they have to cope with a passing that they knew was coming. The moment when she is brought to the afterlife by Given is also a pivotal moment between the interaction of life and death. 

Song and singing are also important themes throughout the novel. As the book's title indicates, singing also plays a powerful role as a symbol and metaphor. The song of the world represents the spirit that, according to the book, haunts it all. Mam and Pop describe the song of the world as a symbol of the "spirit" which lives in everything on Earth. We see the song connecting the natural and supernatural world at the end of the novel through Kayla. At the end of the novel, Kayla sings to the spirits to go home which is her way of connecting with them. This scene also is a play on the title, because it is telling these spirits who died of violence to sing and tell their stories. Once they have sung or told their stories, then they can ascend to the spiritual world, which is what Richie was intending to do. Also, from a cultural perspective, singing is an important element of African-American history, as it played a part in the transmission of African culture by enslaved people and their descendants. 

The theme of the relationship between humans and animals plays a major role in this novel. The novel focuses on the differences between animals and humans and at times blurs the lines between the two. often in the novel characters are given animal-like descriptions. One example comes after Richie has been whipped "When that whip cracked in the air and came down on his back he sounded like a puppy." another comes when Kayla grows ill on the car ride to Parchman and Jojo says "Kayla is her most animal self, a worm-ridden cat in my arms.". Passages like these call into question the divide between humans and animals. They ask, if humans are treated like animals, whether there is any real divide between the two. Additionally, it forces the reader to be conscious of the tragic nature of an animal's life, in particular farm animals, and what these lives might mean in connection with human lives.  

Finally, the theme of water is significant throughout the novel. Water symbolizes the processes of nurturing and developing. Those with water, like River and Mam (who is referred to as the saltwater woman) are able to bloom. Meanwhile, those without water, like those in "Parchman," are withering away without subsistence, unable to find peace and stability. Jojo frequently mentions being thirsty while he, Kayla, Leonie, and Misty drive to Parchman to get his father. He steals drinks and food to feed himself and Kayla but makes sure to provide for Kayla first. When Mam is dying, Leonie gives her a glass of water and when Leonie is passed out after ingesting drugs in the car, she dreams she and her family are drowning. Even the setting in the Mississippi Delta may suggest the importance of water in the novel.

Reception 
Overall, the book received overwhelmingly positive reviews. Based on 34 reviews, the online book review aggregator, Bookmarks, gave the novel a "rave" rating. Reviewing the novel for The Washington Post, Ron Charles compared it to George Saunders's Lincoln in the Bardo and Toni Morrison's Beloved; at NPR, Annalisa Quinn found it "reminiscent of As I Lay Dying by William Faulkner.

The novel was selected by Time magazine and The New York Times as one of the top ten novels of 2017. It is also acclaimed as one of the best novels of the year by the New Statesman, the Financial Times, and BBC, all of which are located in London. Former U.S. President Barack Obama included the novel on a list of the best books he read in 2017. Literary Hub ranked it as the second best book of the 2010s, behind only Claudia Rankine’s Citizen: An American Lyric (2014).

Awards

References

2017 American novels
African-American novels
National Book Award for Fiction winning works
Literature by African-American women
Novels set in Mississippi
Charles Scribner's Sons books